Zhang Jiang Earth Goddess is an annual beauty competition in Shanghai, China, officially started on June 6, 2015, with a press conference at the Parkyard Hotel.  The Zhang Jiang Earth Goddess winner is invited to compete in Miss Earth China which holds a yearly competition. Miss Earth China is one of the national franchises under Miss Earth, the largest international beauty competition devoted to environmental issues.

History
The Zhang Jiang Earth Goddess competition was launched in 2015 to promote environmentalism, charity and the Zhangjiang Hi-Tech Park in Shanghai, China. The event is open to women 18 to 28 years of age working for companies, or attending University, in the Zhangjiang Hi-Tech Park.  The 2015 contestants included those employed by GE, IBM, HP, Honeywell, OLYMPUS, SAP, ZTE, TCL, Dow Chemical Company and others.

The competition is co-organized by Miss Earth China, Parkyard Hotel and the Zhangjiang Hi-Tech Park Development Promotion Association. The Zhang Jiang High Technology Park, is a national level development zone, founded in July, 1992, located on 25km2 with more than 6,000 enterprises. From June to September 2015, numerous events were held including the Earth and Family Day Tree Planting, Zhangjiang Bicycle Ride, Disciples of Escoffier Dinner and Etiquette Training, and Innovation Competition, Fitness training, Zumba Dancing Night, and others. On September 10, the Miss Earth Zhangjiang Goddess held its First Annual Coronation Night at the Parkyard Hotel with 27 contestants.

2015 Coronation Night Rundown
The evening consisted of an introduction, talent performances, swimsuit, gown and question and answer segments. There were also performances from 2014 Little Miss Earth China winner Yu Ping Ying who danced and songs “This is the Moment” performed by Robert Vincenzio and “Reach for the Stars” (an original piece of music specially produced for the Miss Earth China) performed by Quinn Lawrence.  Speeches were delivered by James Zheng the IBM Southern China General Manager, Tori Zwisler the founder of Shanghai Roots and Shoots, Wally Yu of Orbis International, Tony Azarias General manager of the Parkyard Hotel, and Michael J. Rosenthal the Chairman of Miss Earth China.

2015 Titleholders

Quincy Pu of ZTE, who performed a ballet dance to the music of Swan Lake during the show, was the winner, with 1st runner up Iris Xie from GE who performed a magic show, and 2nd runner up Yellen Zeng of SIT who performed in a group dance.  Ling Ling Shen of HP and Juicy Zhou of TCM also made the top five.

2015 Special Awards
Seven special awards were presented as follows:

2015 judges
The ten judges for the 2015 Coronation Night were:

Charity
The 2015 Zhang Jiang Earth Goddess Coronation night featured two charities — Shanghai Roots & Shoots (which runs the Million Tree Project and educates thousands of school children every year), and Orbis International (the largest eye NGO in the World which operates the Flying Eye Hospital).  Proceeds from ticket sales went to Shanghai Roots & Shoots.

Crown

The unique and beautiful Zhang Jiang Earth Goddess crown was created by Boutique jewelry company Atlantis Co., Ltd, a family-run business with its roots in the United Kingdom for more than half a century.  11 craftsmen and 3 designers spent more than 300 hours to create this masterpiece especially for the Zhangjiang Goddess competition.  The crown of environmentalism and technology, which will be used by the reigning 2015 winner, carries the logo of the Zhanjiang Hi Tech Park Development Promotion Association and has the appearance of high technology microchips.  It stands 10 centimeters high, has 866 grams of 100% recycled gold, silver and bronze, and contains 230 carats of Aquamarine and Blue Topaz gemstones from Brazil.  The crown symbolizes prosperity and success in an environmentally sustainable manner.

See also
 Miss Universe China
 Miss China World

References

External links
 Miss Earth
 Miss Earth China

Special Economic Zones of China
China
Beauty pageants in China
Miss